Leucadendron gydoense, the Gydo conebush, is a flower-bearing shrub that belongs to the genus Leucadendron and forms part of the fynbos. The plant is native to the Western Cape, South Africa.

Description
The plant dies in a fire but the seeds survive. The seeds are stored in a toll on the female plant and fall to the ground after a fire and are spread by the wind. The plant is unisexual and there are separate plants with male and female flowers.

Distribution and habitat
The plant occurs in the Kouebokkeveld and Hex River Mountains.

References

External links

gydoense